Mike Gilb is a former member of the Ohio House of Representatives, representing the 76th District from 2001 to 2006.

External links
https://web.archive.org/web/20091211185843/http://www.house.state.oh.us/index.php?option=com_displaymembers&task=detail&district=76

Republican Party members of the Ohio House of Representatives
Living people
21st-century American politicians
Year of birth missing (living people)